The Dorset Gold Tip was a breed of pig originating in the United Kingdom. It is now considered extinct.

Characteristics

The Dorset Gold Tip originated with a Tamworth cross, likely with the Berkshire and possibly with some additional Gloucester Old Spot ancestry. The breed had slightly folded (lop) ears, and a coat with a reddish base colour, like the Tamworth, and black spots: the hairs had gold tips, giving the breed its name.

The Gold Tip was bred for quick growth, early maturing, and extreme size at a time when fat bacon was more desirable than it is today; some specimens were so large they were unable to move out of their pens.

History

The Gold Tip was originally developed during the 19th century. It was always a relatively rare breed, with few licensed boars appearing on records, although it was regularly exhibited during the 1920s and 1930s. By 1955, only one boar was still registered, although the Dorset Gold Tip Pig Society was still in existence in 1961. The breed may have become extinct in the 1960s or 1970s.

References

Extinct British pig breeds
Pig breeds originating in England